Sant Antoni de Benaixeve is a village in the province of Valencia and autonomous community of Valencian Community, Spain.

References

Populated places in the Province of Valencia

es:Sant Antoni de Benaixeve